Lukášov is a village and administrative part of Jablonec nad Nisou in the Liberec Region of the Czech Republic.

References

Neighbourhoods in the Czech Republic